Augusto Renato Colito (born 23 January 1997) is a Spanish volleyball player for CV Río Duero Soria and the Spanish national team.

He participated at the 2017 Men's European Volleyball Championship.

References

1997 births
Living people
Spanish men's volleyball players
Competitors at the 2018 Mediterranean Games
Mediterranean Games silver medalists for Spain
Mediterranean Games medalists in volleyball